The 2006 Sony Ericsson WTA Tour was the 36th season since the founding of the Women's Tennis Association. It commenced on January 2, 2006, and concluded on November 12, 2006 after 61 events.

Justine Henin-Hardenne came out as the winner in a historic three-way battle for the No. 1 ranking at the season-ending WTA Tour Championships, beating out Sharapova and Mauresmo. The Belgian successfully defended her French Open title for her fifth Grand Slam title, and became the first woman since Steffi Graf in 1993 to reach the finals of all four Grand Slams and the WTA Tour Championships. Maria Sharapova won her second Grand Slam title at the U.S. Open, to add to her Wimbledon trophy from 2004. Amélie Mauresmo won her maiden Grand Slam at the Australian Open after a controversial retirement from Henin-Hardenne in the final. However, she later backed it up by winning a rematch with Henin-Hardenne in the Wimbledon final. She was the number one player in the world from March until the final event of the season.

Martina Hingis also made a successful return to the Tour, beginning her comeback at the Gold Coast event in January. She finished the season at No. 6 in the world and won the Tier I title at the Internazionali BNL d'Italia in Rome.

Summary 
Shortly before the beginning of the season former No. 1 Martina Hingis announced that she would return full-time to the tour for the start of the 2006 season, having already made an unsuccessful comeback attempt at an event in 2005.

Amélie Mauresmo won her first Grand Slam title at the Australian Open after years of questions about her nerves and mental strength. However, her victory was marred by Henin-Hardenne's controversial retirement in the final due to stomach cramps. Defending champion Serena Williams lost in the third round to Daniela Hantuchová, with some commenting on the "extra weight" that she was carrying. The loss was the beginning of a season of injury struggles for the American, which saw her at one point drop out of the top 100. In the doubles tournament, Yan Zi and Zheng Jie produced a historic win for Chinese tennis by becoming the first players to win a Grand Slam of any kind for the nation. Martina Hingis won her first mixed doubles title with Mahesh Bhupathi.

Following the Australian Open Kim Clijsters ascended to the No. 1 position after Lindsay Davenport lost her finalist points. She held it until March when she lost her Indian Wells champion points, allowing Mauresmo to return to the position. The Frenchwoman held it until the final event of the season. Mauresmo had continued her strong start to the season with titles in Paris and Antwerp. Elena Dementieva won her biggest career title to that point in Tokyo. Meanwhile, Henin-Hardenne and Nadia Petrova won the Middle Eastern events in Dubai and Doha.

Maria Sharapova picked up her first title of the season in Indian Wells, beating Dementieva in the final. Svetlana Kuznetsova then won in Miami, her first Tier I title and second biggest overall, after a difficult 2005 season where she failed to back up her breakthrough in 2004 and dropped out the top 10.

The clay court season saw Hingis win in Rome for the biggest title of her comeback, but overall the period was dominated by Nadia Petrova, who went on an impressive 15-match winning streak, leading to titles in Amelia Island, Charleston and Berlin, beating Henin-Hardenne in the final of the latter. Her streak led to her being considered the favourite for the French Open title, but she suffered an injury and thus bowed out in the first round. Henin-Hardenne eventually defended her title and won her fifth Grand Slam by beating Kuznetsova in the final. Czech teenager Nicole Vaidišová made headlines by reaching her first Grand Slam semifinal with victories over Amélie Mauresmo and Venus Williams. The doubles event was won by Lisa Raymond and Samantha Stosur, while Katarina Srebotnik took home the mixed doubles trophy with Nenad Zimonjić.

The third Grand Slam of the year at Wimbledon saw all top four seeds reach the semifinals for only the fifth time in 25 years. Mauresmo and Henin advanced to the final, a rematch of their Australian Open final earlier in the season, with Mauresmo triumphant once more, becoming the first Frenchwoman in 81 years to win Wimbledon. Defending champion Venus Williams fell to Jelena Janković, making this year the first since 1999 neither Williams sister featured in the Wimbledon women's singles final. Williams did however make the mixed doubles final, losing to Vera Zvonareva who won her second Grand Slam in mixed doubles, partnering Bob Bryan. Yan Zi and Zheng Jie also won their second Grand Slam titles in the women's doubles event.

Serena Williams, Mary Pierce, Lindsay Davenport and Nadia Petrova all returned from injuries during the summer hardcourt season. Clijsters won her fourth Stanford title, before losing to Sharapova in the final of San Diego—the Russian's first ever victory over Clijsters. Dementieva won the title in Los Angeles, beating Janković in the final. Janković's compatriot Ana Ivanovic went one further the next week in Montréal, and by winning the event over Hingis she became the U.S. Open Series champion for that year. Sharapova eventually picked up the grand prize, taking the U.S. Open title over Henin-Hardenne in the final. Janković backed up her strong result in Los Angeles with her first Grand Slam semifinal. In the doubles tournament Nathalie Dechy and Vera Zvonareva won the title in only their fourth tournament as a team. Tennis legend Martina Navratilova won the mixed doubles title and then announced her retirement from professional tennis.

Sharapova continued her strong results following her U.S. Open title in the fall season, winning events in Zurich and Linz. Nadia Petrova won her fifth title of the season in Stuttgart, but lost to the Russian teenager Anna Chakvetadze in the Moscow final. Kuznetsova also enjoyed a successful fall, winning titles in Bali and Beijing, beating Mauresmo in the final of the latter. Kim Clijsters returned at the end of the season, having missed her title defence at the U.S. Open, and won the smaller event in Hasselt.

The season climaxed at the WTA Tour Championships with Mauresmo, Sharapova, Henin-Hardenne, Kuznetsova, Petrova, Clijsters, Dementieva and Hingis all qualifying for the event. The tournament saw a three-way battle for the No. 1 position between Mauresmo, Sharapova and Henin-Hardenne, which was eventually decided when Henin-Hardenne beat Sharapova in the semifinal. The Belgian went on to defeat Mauresmo in the final. In the doubles event French Open champions Lisa Raymond and Samantha Stosur triumphed, consolidating their position as the year-end No. 1 in women's doubles.

Schedule 
The table below shows the 2006 WTA Tour schedule.

Key

January

February

March

April

May

June

July

August

September

October

November

Calendar and other changes 
 The French Open main draw began play on Sunday rather than the traditional Monday start, making it a 15-day tournament. Prize money between the men and women was also made equal for the first time.
 Two new events were created: the Bangalore Open in Bangalore, India, replacing the previous event held in Hyderabad; and the Anda Open in Tel Aviv, Israel—later cancelled due to the 2006 Lebanon War.
 The Advanta Championships was removed from the calendar.
 The Porsche Tennis Grand Prix was moved from its previous home of Filderstadt to Stuttgart.
 The WTA Tour Championships were held in Madrid, Spain for the first time, having spent several years in Los Angeles. It stayed there for the 2007 season.
 The four Grand Slam tournaments and Miami were made into mandatory events, meaning all players that qualified by ranking had to play them or they received a "zero-pointer" on their ranking.
 Prize money of the standard Tiers was raised slightly: Tier I was now $40,000 higher, Tier II was $15,000 higher, and Tier III and IV both $5,000 higher.
 The previous Tier V category was completely abolished.
 Bonus points, where previously a player could receive extra points in addition to their round points depending on the ranking of the opponent they beat, were also abolished.
 Also in 2006, the WTA began experimenting with on-court coaching, allowing players to call their coach onto the court for advice between sets. It was tested in five events during 2006, and continued in the 2007 season.
 Electronic line calling, or "Hawk-Eye", was premiered during the season. The Sony Ericsson Open was the first event to utilise the new technology. Later that year, the U.S. Open became the first Grand Slam to use it. It has since been used in every Grand Slam tournament except the French Open (the ball leaves a mark on the clay, therefore it is not thought to be necessary.)

Statistics 
List of players and titles won, last name alphabetically:
  Justine Henin-Hardenne - Sydney, Dubai, French Open, Eastbourne, New Haven and WTA Tour Championships (6)
  Nadia Petrova - Doha, Amelia Island, Charleston, Berlin and Stuttgart (5)
  Maria Sharapova - Indian Wells, San Diego, U.S. Open, Zurich and Linz (5)
  Amélie Mauresmo - Australian Open, Paris, Antwerp and Wimbledon (4)
  Marion Bartoli - Auckland, Tokyo and Quebec City (3)
  Kim Clijsters - Warsaw, Stanford and Hasselt (3)
  Svetlana Kuznetsova - Miami, Bali and Beijing (3)
  Shahar Pe'er - Pattaya City, Prague and Istanbul (3)
  Anna Chakvetadze - Guangzhou and Moscow (2)
  Elena Dementieva - Tokyo and Los Angeles (2)
  Martina Hingis - Rome and Kolkata (2)
  Michaëlla Krajicek - Hobart and 's-Hertogenbosch (2)
  Anabel Medina Garrigues - Canberra and Palermo (2)
  Meghann Shaughnessy - Rabat and Forest Hills (2)
  Zheng Jie - Estoril and Stockholm (2)
  Vera Zvonareva - Birmingham and Cincinnati (2)
  Sofia Arvidsson - Memphis (1)
  Alona Bondarenko - Luxembourg (1)
  Eleni Daniilidou - Seoul (1)
  Lourdes Domínguez Lino - Bogotá (1)
  Anna-Lena Grönefeld - Acapulco (1)
  Ana Ivanovic - Montréal (1)
  Vania King - Bangkok (1)
  Tamira Paszek - Portoroz (1)
  Lucie Šafářová - Gold Coast (1)
  Mara Santangelo - Bangalore (1)
  Anna Smashnova - Budapest (1)
  Sun Tiantian - Tashkent (1)
  Nicole Vaidišová - Strasbourg (1)

The following players won their first title:
  Marion Bartoli - Auckland
  Shahar Pe'er - Pattaya City
  Mara Santangelo - Bangalore
  Sofia Arvidsson - Memphis
  Lourdes Domínguez Lino - Bogotá
  Anna-Lena Grönefeld - Acapulco
  Tamira Paszek - Portoroz
  Alona Bondarenko - Luxembourg
  Anna Chakvetadze - Guangzhou
  Sun Tiantian - Tashkent
  Vania King - Bangkok

Titles won by nation:
  - 18 (Tokyo, Indian Wells, Miami, Amelia Island, Charleston, Berlin, Birmingham, Cincinnati, San Diego, Los Angeles, U.S. Open, Bali, Beijing, Guangzhou, Stuttgart, Moscow, Zurich and Linz)
  - 9 (Sydney, Dubai, Warsaw, French Open, Eastbourne, Stanford, New Haven, Hasselt and WTA Tour Championships)
  - 7 (Auckland, Australian Open, Paris, Antwerp, Wimbledon, Tokyo and Quebec City)
  - 4 (Pattaya City, Prague, Istanbul and Budapest)
  - 3 (Estoril, Stockholm and Tashkent)
  - 3 (Canberra, Bogotá and Palermo)
  - 3 (Rabat, Forest Hills and Bangkok)
  - 2 (Gold Coast and Strasbourg)
  - 2 (Hobart and 's-Hertogenbosch)
  - 2 (Rome and Kolkata)
  - 1 (Portoroz)
  - 1 (Acapulco)
  - 1 (Seoul)
  - 1 (Bangalore)
  - 1 (Montréal)
  - 1 (Memphis)
  - 1 (Luxembourg)

Rankings 
Below are the 2006 WTA year-end rankings in both singles and doubles competition:

Singles number 1 ranking

See also 
 2006 ATP Tour
 WTA Tour
 List of female tennis players
 List of tennis tournaments

References 

 
WTA Tour
WTA Tour seasons